Nordbø is a surname. Notable people with the surname include:

Anker Nordbø (1920–1978), Norwegian politician
Eldrid Nordbø (born 1942), Norwegian politician
Inger Nordbø (1915–2004), Danish/Norwegian sports swimmer and diver
Kurt Nordbø (1931–2009), Norwegian politician
Rasmus Nordbø (1915–1983), Norwegian politician
Torolf Nordbø (born 1956), Norwegian musician and comedian